is a train station in the city of Ōgaki, Gifu Prefecture, Japan operated by the Central Japan Railway Company (JR Tōkai). It is also a freight terminal for the Japan Freight Railway Company.

Lines
The station is also served by the all-freight Seinō Railway's Ichihashi Line.

Layout
Mino-Akasaka Station has one side platform serving a single bi-directional line. The station is unattended.

Adjacent stations

|-
!colspan=5|Central Japan Railway Company

|-
!colspan=5|Seinō Railway Company

History
Mino-Akasaka Station opened on August 1, 1919. The station was absorbed into the JR Tōkai network upon the privatization of the Japanese National Railways (JNR) on April 1, 1987.

Surrounding area
Kanabusan Jinja
O-chaya yashiki site

See also
 List of Railway Stations in Japan

External links

Railway stations in Japan opened in 1919
Railway stations in Gifu Prefecture
Tōkaidō Main Line
Stations of Central Japan Railway Company
Stations of Japan Freight Railway Company
Ōgaki